The Russian Ecological Party "The Greens" (REP "The Greens") is a green political party in the Russian Federation. It was founded in 1992 as the Constructive-Ecological Movement of Russia "Kedr" (KEDR). In 2002 the party was transformed into the Russian Ecological Party "The Greens".
The party endorsed Vladimir Putin in the 2018 Russian presidential election.

History

In the 2007 Russian regional elections "The Greens" gained 7.58% of the votes in the Samara Oblast, gaining deputies in the Samara Regional Duma.

Before the 2007 parliamentary elections, the Russian Central Electoral Commission decided that the Russian Ecological Party "The Greens" would not be able to stand, due to an alleged large number of faked signatures (17%, more than the allowed 5%) in their supporters' lists.

In 2008 the XV congress of the party decided to transform the party into the social movement Russian Ecological Movement "Greens" (Российское экологическое движение «Зеленые»). It advised all members and supporters of the party to join A Just Russia.

In 2012 the members met and decided to register as a party and not as a social movement. The decision was carried out successfully and the party registered itself.

The party endorsed Putin in the 2018 Russian presidential election.

Attempt of Corporate raid in 2021 

On April 29, 2021, the official website of "The Greens" party published a statement of its chairman Panfilov A. saying that a group of people headed by some A. Komarov on instructions of the state authorities conspired to seize the party with the aim of preventing it from the 2021 Duma elections.

On May 12, 2021, the Central Council expelled from the party former deputy Minister of Resources of Krasnoyarsk krai Shakhmatov S. for participation in raider seizure of the party.

A group of people involved in the takeover of the party sent out a press release to mass media saying that on May 15 in "President-hotel" an illegitimate congress of the party took place; there it was decided to overthrow the former leadership and to change the charter which made it impossible for the party to participate in elections to State Duma on September 19, 2021, because the charter has to be presented not later than one year before the elections.

The real official legitimate congress of the party will take place on May 21–22, 2021, at the Cosmos Hotel.

Electoral results

Presidential elections

Legislative elections

See also 
Green party
Green politics
List of environmental organizations

References

External links
Official website

1994 establishments in Russia
Political parties disestablished in 2008
Political parties established in 1994
Registered political parties in Russia
Green political parties in Russia
Green conservative parties
Agrarian parties